The Methodist Theological School in Ohio (MTSO) is a graduate theological school and seminary in Delaware, Ohio. MTSO is one of the 13 official seminaries of The United Methodist Church.

MTSO is accredited by the North Central Association of Colleges and Schools of The Higher Learning Commission and is also accredited the Association of Theological Schools in the United States and Canada to provide post-baccalaureate professional and academic degree programs to educate persons for the practice of ministry and for teaching and research in the theological disciplines.

In addition to The United Methodist Church, MTSO students represent over a dozen faith traditions.

History

In April 1958, 48 members of the Provisional Organization for the Establishment of The Methodist Theological School in Ohio signed a document laying the groundwork for the construction of a new educational institution on 70 hillside acres in Central Ohio.

In 1959, $4 million had been raised for the project. In 1960 the first classes met on the new campus.

Rev. John W. Dickhaut was named as the first president of MTSO and Van Bogard Dunn was appointed as the first academic dean. Dickhaut served as president for 22 years. In 1963, the first graduating class of MTSO was all-male and included one African-American graduate. The first female graduated from MTSO in 1964.

During the 1960s, MTSO established a legacy of focus on issues relating to social justice. Many of the faculty and students protested racial discrimination in the United States during these years. In 1973, MTSO joined Trinity Lutheran Seminary and the Pontifical College Josephinum to form the Theological Consortium of Greater Columbus. In 1981, MTSO named Rev. Buford A. Dickinson as the successor to Dickhaut as the president. Dickinson served for five years and was succeeded by Rev. Dr. Norman E. "Ned" Dewire, who would serve for 20 years.

Rev. Jay Rundell was named the fourth president of MTSO on July 1, 2006, and serves as president of the institution. Dr. Valerie Bridgeman is the academic dean.

Academics

MTSO offers studies in multiple disciplines within the field of theological education. These include Biblical Studies, Pastoral Counseling, Historical Studies, Evangelism, Practical Theology, Theological Studies, the Study of Religion, Inter-Religious Relations, and Wesleyan Studies.

Students are required to engage in contextual education including field education, supervised internships, clinical pastoral education (CPE) units, and cross-cultural trips.

Faculty
MTSO currently has 18 Full-time and 5 Part-time members of the faculty.

Governance
MTSO is governed by a 19 member Board of Trustees.

Campus
Facilities on the campus include:
Alford Centrum 
Burgett Preaching Chapel
Dewire Residence Hall
Dickhaut Library
Dunn Dining Hall
Gault Hall 
Helen Werner Apartment Building
Kleist Manor Apartments
Werner Hall

Outdoor facilities include a chapel, labyrinth, and walking trails. In 2013, MTSO announced a sustainability initiative that will make MTSO's campus more environmentally responsible.

Academics
MTSO offers multiple graduate degrees:
Master of Divinity (M.Div.) 
Master of Arts in Counseling Ministries (MACM) [Clinical Counseling Track Suspended as of Spring 2017] 
Master of Theological Studies (MTS)
Master of Arts in Practical Theology (MAPT)
Master of Arts in Social Justice (MASJ) 
Doctor of Ministry (D.Min.)

The school also offers several non-degree certificate programs.

Lecture Series
The Schooler Institute on Preaching
Williams Lectures on Theology

Notable alumni
 Hae-Jong Kim, retired bishop of The United Methodist Church.
 Dagmar Braun Celeste, former first lady of Ohio
 James W. Moore preacher, pastor and author
 John B. Ellington, Jr., Air National Guard Major General

References

External links
Official website

Seminaries and theological colleges in Ohio
United Methodist seminaries